A protected area with sustainable use of natural resources or managed resource protected area is a protected area in which the aim is to protect and preserve biological diversity in the long term. The IUCN defines such areas as Category VI.

IUCN definition 
According to the IUCN, protected areas with sustainable use of natural resources are defined as areas that:

Criticism 
The concept is criticised by ecologists on the grounds that the aspiration for these areas is hardly practicable in reality because nature conservation is almost never possible without restricting human activity and also because the economic activities of a population inevitably affect the ecosystems.

See also 
 IUCN protected area categories

References 

Protected areas